Iffley Station is a pastoral lease that currently operates as a cattle station in Queensland.

Description
The property is composed of rolling downs grassed with Mitchell grass, bluegrass, salt bush and other herbages.

Both the Saxby and the Norman Rivers traverse the property.

History
In 1884 the  property was sold by Messrs Walsh, Brown and Walsh to D. F. MacKay along with the 4,400 head of cattle it was stocked with. Mackay placed the station on the market in 1894.

The property was placed on the market by the trustees of the estate of D. F. MacKay in 1904. Stocked with about 15,000 Durham cattle and 187 horses the  station included managers house, men's quarters store house, cattle yards and two recently sunk bores.

In 1931 the property was owned by Kidman and Angliss, who remained in charge until at least 1942.

The property was acquired by Don McDonald, the eldest son of Jim McDonald, in 1979 along with Rutland Plains. Iffley is currently owned by MDH, still owned by the McDonald family, and is one of the companies 11 cattle stations throughout Queensland. It is managed by Clint and Heidi Smith who have been there since 2003.

See also
List of ranches and stations

References

Stations (Australian agriculture)
Pastoral leases in Queensland
North West Queensland